John Drewe (fl. 1393) was an English politician.

Drewe was a Member of Parliament for Bodmin, Cornwall in 1393. Little more is known of him.

References

Year of birth missing
Year of death missing
14th-century births
English MPs 1393
Members of the Parliament of England for Bodmin